Mitiamo railway station was located on the Yungera line, serving the Victoria town of Mitiamo. The station closed to passenger traffic on 4 October 1981 as part of the New Deal timetable for country passengers.

Prior to its 1981 closure, Mitiamo was abolished as a staff station in 1978, and was replaced with the section Dingee – Pyramid.

References

External links
 Melway map at street-directory.com.au

Disused railway stations in Victoria (Australia)